Henrik Meyer Nielsen (3 November 1886 – 8 August 1973) was a Norwegian gymnast who competed in the 1920 Summer Olympics. He was part of the Norwegian team, which won the silver medal in the gymnastics men's team, free system event.

References 

1886 births
1973 deaths
Gymnasts at the 1920 Summer Olympics
Norwegian male artistic gymnasts
Olympic gymnasts of Norway
Olympic silver medalists for Norway
Olympic medalists in gymnastics
Medalists at the 1920 Summer Olympics
20th-century Norwegian people